Semicassis bisulcata, common name: the Japanese bonnet,  is a species of large sea snail, a marine gastropod mollusk in the family Cassidae, the helmet snails and bonnet snails.

Description

The size of an adult shell varies between 25 mm and 85 mm. They are carnivorous and mainly feed on other smaller marine gastropods like Umbonium vestiarium.

Distribution
This species occurs in the Red Sea and in the Indo-West Pacific.

References

 Vine, P. (1986). Red Sea Invertebrates. Immel Publishing, London. 224 pp

External links

Cassidae
Gastropods described in 1829